The 1983 Hong Kong Urban Council election was held on 8 March 1983 for the elected seats of the Urban Council. It marked the centenary of the establishment of the Urban Council and the largely reformed electoral methods with the creation of the district-based constituencies and massive expansion of the electorate.

Overview
1983 marked the centenary of the Urban Council. Elections for the certain numbers of seats in the Urban Council had been held since 1888, but the electorates were strictly limited to the residents on the jurors list or with certain professions. All elected members were voted in a single constituency.

Since the colonial government began the reform on the district administrations on the eve of the Sino-British negotiation over the Hong Kong sovereignty after 1997, the 1983 election marked a major change of the Urban Council. The elected members increased from 12 to 15 whilst the appointed members increased from 12 to 15 as well, which increased the total members from 24 to 30. 15 elected members were elected by electorates of each constituency in Hong Kong Island, Kowloon and New Kowloon with single member plurality method. The electorate base was fully extended to all Hong Kong permanent residents over 21 to about 568,000 voters, which made the electorate increased by 17 times.

Despite the two long existing political groups in the Urban Council, the Hong Kong Civic Association and the Reform Club of Hong Kong, the Hong Kong People's Council on Public Housing Policy (PCPHP), a pressure group which devoted itself to the public housing policies also fill in two candidates, vice-chairman Lam Chak-piu in Kwun Tong East and secretary-general Frederick Fung in Sham Shui Po East, which made it the first pressure group to have representative in the election.

Total of 127,303, 22.4 per cent of the eligible voters turned out on the election day on 8 March, where Sham Shui Po recorded the highest turnout of 26.7 per cent and Wong Tai Sin had the second highest of 26 per cent. Eastern District which included the North Point and Shau Kei Wan constituencies recorded the lowest turnout of 20.4 per cent.

Outcome of election

Elected members

References

Hong Kong
1983 in Hong Kong
Urban
1983 elections in British Overseas Territories
March 1983 events in Asia